Babette Koblenz (born 22 August 1956 in Hamburg) is a German composer associated with Neue Einfachheit.

Life and work 
From the age of twelve, Koblenz studied at the music theory at the Hochschule für Musik und Theater Hamburg. Her compositions have been performed at the Munich Biennale, the Donaueschinger Musiktage, and the Darmstädter Ferienkurse. She is married to the composer Hans-Christian von Dadelsen, with whom she runs the publishing house Kodasi.

Compositions (selection) 
 Includes material from the German-language Wikipedia version of this article

Orchestral works 
 Radar (1987/88) for piano and orchestra
 Verhör (1989), on a text by Thomas Höft, for soprano, baritone, and orchestra
 Messe Française „La Partisane“ (1991) for alto, tenor, mixed chorus, and orchestra
 Al Fondo Negro (1993) for large orchestra
 You (1995/96) for string orchestra
 Inlines or Outlaws (2000) for guitar orchestra
 Blau (2002) for guitar orchestra

References 

German classical composers
1956 births
Living people
Musicians from Hamburg